Pompili is an Italian language surname.

People with the surname 

 Barbara Pompili (born 1975), French politician
 Basilio Pompili (1858–1931), Italian cardinal
 Enrico Pompili (born 1968), Italian pianist

See also 

 Pompei
 Pompeii

Surnames
Surnames of Italian origin
Italian-language surnames